Hippolyte Schouppe was a Belgian rower. He competed at the 1924 Summer Olympics in Paris with the men's eight where they were eliminated in the round one repechage.

References

External links
 

Year of birth unknown
Year of death unknown
Belgian male rowers
Olympic rowers of Belgium
Rowers at the 1924 Summer Olympics
European Rowing Championships medalists
20th-century Belgian people